Genghis Khan was the founder of the Mongol Empire.

Genghis may also refer to:

Books
The Conqueror series of novels by Conn Iggulden:
Genghis: Birth of an Empire
Genghis: Lords of the Bow
Genghis: Bones of the Hills
Genghis: Empire of Silver

Locations
Genghis Hills, topographical elevations in the Shackleton Range, Antarctica
Genghis Grill, an American restaurant chain

Music
Genghis Barbie, a horn quartet from New York
Genghis Tron, a four-piece experimental metal band from New York
Genghis Danger, an extended play by British music producer Rusko
Genghis Blues, a 1999 American documentary film about Paul Pena

Other uses
Genghis (robot), a six legged insect-like robot from the 1970s
Genghis John, nickname of US Air Force fighter pilot John Boyd

See also
 Genghis Khan (disambiguation)
 Chinggis (disambiguation)
 Temujin (disambiguation)

Genghisids, Asian dynasties descended from Genghis Khan